Joachim Gustav Henric Lantz (born 10 May 1977) is a Swedish former footballer who played as a defender.

References

External links

Fotbolltransfers profile

1977 births
Living people
Swedish footballers
Association football defenders
Kalmar FF players
IFK Västerås players
Mjällby AIF players
Östers IF players
Allsvenskan players
Superettan players
People from Kalmar
Sportspeople from Kalmar County